Colorado State Knowledge Bowl Meet is the state tournament for high school Knowledge Bowl teams in Colorado, United States. It is usually held at Colorado College in Colorado Springs. Teams qualify for the state meet based on performance at regional competition and are grouped by size similar to Colorado High School Activities Association (CHSAA) classification, although teams from all divisions play each other. The first meet was held in 1978 at Fort Lewis College in Durango. The overall champion received the traveling "Governor's Cup" trophy for a year. Teams qualify for state through several regional competitions. The winner of each class from each region qualifies moves on to the state competition.

Past Results

References 

Student quiz competitions
Education in Colorado